James Trecothick Austin (January 7, 1784 – May 8, 1870) was the 22nd Massachusetts Attorney General.  Austin was the son of Massachusetts Secretary of the Commonwealth, and Treasurer and Receiver-General of Massachusetts Jonathan L. Austin. He was elected a Fellow of the American Academy of Arts and Sciences in 1824.  He graduated from Harvard College in 1802.

In 1837, he spoke at Faneuil Hall in praise of anti-abolitionists who had killed Elijah P. Lovejoy. He compared the mob to American patriots rising against the British and declared that Lovejoy "died as the fool dieth!"

Family
Austin married Catharine Gerry, the eldest daughter  of Elbridge Gerry,  they had a son, Ivers James Austin, born February 14, 1808, and a daughter, Marie Cornelia Ritchie Austin, born on March 8, 1821.

Notes

References

Further reading
 Dwight, Benjamin Woodbridge (1871), The History of the Descendants of Elder John Strong, of Northampton, Mass., Volume II., Albany, N.Y.: Joel Munsell, p. 1206.
 Linzee, John William (1917), The Linzee families of Great Britain and the United States of America and The Allied Families, Volume II., Boston, Massachusetts: John William Linzee, p. 768.
 Wilson, James Grant (1888), Appletons' Cyclopedia of American Biography, Vol. I., Aaron-Crandall, New York, N.Y.: D. APPLETON AND COMPANY, p. 120.

Bibliography
The Life of Elbridge Gerry, with Contemporary Letters to the Close of the American Revolution. 2 Volumes, (1827–1829).

1784 births
1870 deaths
Massachusetts lawyers
Massachusetts Attorneys General
District attorneys in Suffolk County, Massachusetts
Lawyers from Boston
Members of the Massachusetts House of Representatives
Fellows of the American Academy of Arts and Sciences
Massachusetts National Republicans
19th-century American politicians
19th-century American lawyers
Harvard College alumni